= Vancouver Animation School =

Canadian school specialising in animation and digital entertainment

- Burnaby, British Columbia, Canada

Information
- Other name: VANAS
- Type: Private career college
- Established: 2010
- Website: https://www.vanas.ca/

Vancouver Animation School (VANAS) is a Canadian private educational institution specialising in online education for the animation, visual effects and video game industries. Founded in 2010, the school offers vocational certificates and diplomas in digital arts and entertainment-related disciplines.

== History ==
Vancouver Animation School was founded in December 2010 in British Columbia, Canada. The institution was established as an online school focused on professional training for the digital entertainment industries.

In 2013, Vancouver Animation School announced that it had received accreditation from the Private Career Training Institutions Agency (PCTIA), the regulatory body responsible for private career training institutions in British Columbia at the time.

In 2015, Vancouver Animation School partnered with Universidad Iberoamericana Puebla in Mexico to offer an online programme in 3D character animation. The programme was delivered in English by instructors from Vancouver Animation School.

== Academic programs ==
Vancouver Animation School offers vocational certificates and diplomas in disciplines related to digital entertainment.

Its diploma programmes include:

- 2D Computer Animation
- 3D Computer Animation
- Animated Short Films
- Concept Art
- Production Management in Digital Entertainment
- Esports Management
- Video Game Design
- Virtual Reality
- 3D Modelling
- Digital Matte Painting
- Effects Animation

Certificate programmes include:

- Introduction to Digital Arts
- Entrepreneurship in Animation, Visual Effects and Video Games
- Writing for Animation
- Professional Career Development

== Online education ==
The school delivers its programmes online. Its educational activities include live online instruction and practical coursework.

== International activities ==
The school has participated in educational initiatives outside Canada, including its 2015 partnership with Universidad Iberoamericana Puebla in Mexico.
